Yoann Rapinier (born 29 September 1989 in Pontoise, France) is a French triple jumper of Martiniquan descent.

Achievements

References

1989 births
Living people
French male triple jumpers
French people of Martiniquais descent
Sportspeople from Val-d'Oise